A bronze sculpture of composer George M. Cohan by artist Georg John Lober and architect Otto Langman is installed at Duffy Square, part of Times Square, in the New York City borough of Manhattan.

Cast in 1959 and dedicated on September 11, 1959, the statue rests on a light Barre granite pedestal, which is set on a dark Barre granite base.

See also

 1959 in art

References

External links

 

1959 establishments in New York City
1959 sculptures
Bronze sculptures in Manhattan
Granite sculptures in New York City
Monuments and memorials in Manhattan
Outdoor sculptures in Manhattan
Sculptures of men in New York City
Statues in New York City
Times Square